Mavrodi may refer to:
Alexandru Mavrodi (1881–1934), Romanian theatre director and politician
Ivan Mavrodi (1911–1981), Bulgarian-Ukrainian writer and poet
Sergei Mavrodi (1955–2018), Russian mathematician and businessman, known for his MMM pyramid scheme
Sergey A. Mavrody (1967), Russian and American writer, designer and film director

Romanian-language surnames
Surnames of Moldovan origin